"Hep Cat Baby" is a country music song written by Cy Coben, sung by Eddy Arnold, and released in 1947 on the RCA Victor label. In August 1954, it reached No. 7 on the Billboard folk juke box chart. It was also ranked as the No. 25 record on the Billboard 1954 year-end folk juke box chart.

The song has been included on multiple Eddie Arnold albums and compilations, including Hep Cat Baby, There's Been a Change in Me (1951-1955) (2008), and The Complete US Chart Singles 1945-62 (2014).

See also
 Billboard Top Country & Western Records of 1954

References

Eddy Arnold songs
1954 songs
Songs written by Cy Coben